Ruthenica filograna is a species of air-breathing land snail, a terrestrial pulmonate gastropod mollusk in the family Clausiliidae, the door snails, all of which have a clausilium. 

Subspeciesd
 Ruthenica filograna catarrhactae (E. A. Bielz, 1861)
 Ruthenica filograna filograna (Rossmässler, 1836)
 Ruthenica filograna kimakowiczi H. Nordsieck, 2019
 Ruthenica filograna pocaterrae Egorov, 2022
 Ruthenica filograna polita (M. Kimakowicz, 1883)
 Ruthenica filograna streicola H. Nordsieck, 2019

Distribution
This species is not listed in IUCN Red List - not evaluated (NE) 

The native distribution of this species is Baltic, Central European and Eastern European. It has been recorded from:
 The Czech Republic
 Slovakia
 Ukraine
 and others

The habitat of this species is woodland.

References

 Rossmässler, E. A. (1835-1837). Iconographie der Land- & Süßwasser- Mollusken, mit vorzüglicher Berücksichtigung der europäischen noch nicht abgebildeten Arten. (1) 1 (1): VI + 1-132. pl. 1-5 
 Kerney, M.P., Cameron, R.A.D. & Jungbluth, J-H. (1983). Die Landschnecken Nord- und Mitteleuropas. Ein Bestimmungsbuch für Biologen und Naturfreunde, 384 pp., 24 plates. 
 Sysoev, A. V. & Schileyko, A. A. (2009). Land snails and slugs of Russia and adjacent countries. Sofia/Moskva (Pensoft). 312 pp., 142 plates. [
 Bank, R. A.; Neubert, E. (2017). Checklist of the land and freshwater Gastropoda of Europe. Last update: July 16th, 2017.

External links
 Clessin, S. (1872). Clausilia filograna (Ziegler) in Südbayern. Nachrichtsblatt der deutschen malakozoologischen Gesellschaft. 4 (4): 50-55

Clausiliidae
Gastropods described in 1836